Heidt is a surname. Notable people with the surname include:
Brad Heidt, Canadian curler 
Gary Heidt (born 1970), American conceptual artist 
Horace Heidt (1901–1986), American pianist, big band leader, and radio and television personality
Winifred Heidt (1906-1990), American, Detroit based Opera Singer. Broadway Performer as Carmen in 1945. Performed on NBC Television Opera Theatre in 1949. Broadway Performer in Carousel as Mrs. Mullin in 1954.
Mike Heidt (born 1963), German-Canadian ice hockey player 
Peter Heidt (born 1965), German politician